Brian Lewis Morrissey (born 14 September 1953) is a former New Zealand rugby union player. A loose forward, Morrissey represented Waikato at a provincial level, and was a member of the New Zealand national side, the All Blacks, on the 1981 tour of Romania and France. He played three matches for the All Blacks but did not appear in any internationals.

References

1953 births
Living people
People from Putāruru
New Zealand rugby union players
New Zealand international rugby union players
Waikato rugby union players
Rugby union flankers
Rugby union number eights
Rugby union players from Waikato
People educated at Tokoroa High School